Adela trigrapha is a moth of the  family Adelidae or fairy longhorn moths. It was described by Zeller in 1876 and is found in western North America, from Vancouver Island to California.

The length of the forewings is 5.5–6.2 mm. Adult males have large eyes and long white antenna (three times the forewing length). The forewings are black and usually crossed by three white lines. Females are smaller and have smaller eyes and antennae. They have a bright orange head. The forewings are bright metallic blue and the hindwings are purple.

The larvae possibly feed on Leptosiphon androsaceus and Leptosiphon bicolor.

References

Adelidae
Moths described in 1876
Moths of North America
Taxa named by Philipp Christoph Zeller